Juan Carlos Lamas (October 13, 1921 – July 27, 2004), born Rafael Velázquez, was an Argentine actor from Rosario. He starred in the 1962 film Una Jaula no tiene secretos.

Selected filmography
 Poppy (1952)
 Sunday Heroes (1952)
 The Romance of a Gaucho (1961)

References

External links
 
 

Argentine male film actors
1921 births
2004 deaths
Male actors from Rosario, Santa Fe